Events in the year 1030 in Norway.

Incumbents
Monarch - Cnut the Great

Events
29 July - Battle of Stiklestad.

Deaths
Olaf II of Norway, king (born c. 995).
Bjørn Stallare, civil servant.

References

Norway